Villu is an Estonian masculine given name, a version of William.

People named Villu include:

Villu Jürjo (born 1950), Lutheran cleric and politician
Villu Kangur (born 1957), poet, translator, actor and screenwriter
Villu Kõve (born 1971), judge, Chief Justice of the Supreme Court of Estonia
Villu Reiljan (born 1953), politician
Villu Tamme (born 1963), punk musician (J.M.K.E.)
Villu Toots (1916–1993), calligrapher, book designer, educator, palaeographer and author
Villu Veski (born 1962), saxophonist and music teacher

Estonian masculine given names